NGC 7320c is a galaxy member of the Stephan's Quintet located in the constellation Pegasus.

References 

  http://seds.org/

External links 

Intermediate spiral galaxies
Pegasus (constellation)
7320c
69279